Alvandkuh-e Sharqi Rural District is a rural district (dehestan) in the Central District of Hamadan County, Hamadan Province, Iran. At the 2006 census, its population was 6,448, in 1,719 families. The rural district has 8 villages.

References 

Rural Districts of Hamadan Province
Hamadan County